Javier Sánchez and Mark Woodforde were the defending champions, but competed this year with different partners. Sánchez teamed up with Luis Lobo and lost in the first round to David Adams and Andrei Olhovskiy, while Woodforde teamed up with Yevgeny Kafelnikov and lost in the quarterfinals to Luke Jensen and David Wheaton.

Cyril Suk and Daniel Vacek won the title by defeating Luke Jensen and David Wheaton 3–6, 7–6, 7–6 in the final.

Seeds

Draw

Draw

References

External links
 Official results archive (ATP)
 Official results archive (ITF)

Nice